Đorđe Lazović (born 1 October 1990) is a Serbian football defender.

Career

Sloga Požega
Born in Čačak, after youth career in Borac, Lazović joined Sloga Požega, where he made 22 caps for the 2009–10 season.

Mladost Lučani
For the 2010–11 season, Lazović signed with Serbian First League club Mladost Lučani, where he spent four seasons. For the first season he made 11 appearances, mostly as a backup player. In 2011–12 season, he was more standard, playing 16 matches and scored 1 goal against Inđija. For 2012–13 and 2013–14 he played 20 league matches at each, and he also played 1 cup match, against OFK Beograd in 2013–14 season. After winning the Serbian First League with Mladost Lučani, and promotion in Serbian SuperLiga at the end 2013–14 of season, he left the club.

Kolubara
First half of 2014–15 season, Lazović spent with Serbian First League club Kolubara, where he played 11 matches.

Borac Čačak
Lazović returned in his home club in January 2015, but he didn't play for the spring half of 2014–15 season. He made his SuperLiga debut in the 8th fixture of 2015–16, against Jagodina, replacing Vladimir Krstić before the end of match.

Career statistics

Honours
Mladost
Serbian First League: 2013–14

References

External links
 
 Đorđe Lazović stats at utakmica.rs 
 

1990 births
Living people
Sportspeople from Čačak
Association football defenders
Serbian footballers
FK Sloga Požega players
FK Mladost Lučani players
FK Kolubara players
FK Borac Čačak players
Serbian SuperLiga players